Philip I (died 1473) was Metropolitan of Moscow from 1464 to 1473. He was the third Metropolitan in Moscow to be appointed by the civil authority without the approval of the Ecumenical Patriarch of Constantinople as had been the norm.

Information about Philip's life only begins in 1455, when he was already the Archbishop of Suzdal. In 1464, he was appointed Metropolitan of Moscow, hand-picked by Theodosius at the time of his resignation, just as Theodosius had been picked by his predecessor, Iona

In the 1470s, Philip was actively engaged in a struggle against the Polish-Lithuanian influence over Novgorod, particularly the influence of the Metropolitan of Lithuania and the fear that Novgorod would defect to him and eventually go over to Catholicism.

While he was instrumental in bringing Sophia Paleologue from Rome to Moscow in 1472, Philip was against admitting a papal legate in her entourage into Moscow, thus continuing his opposition to Catholicism or "Latinism" in his province.
 
That same year, Philip started reconstructing the Cathedral of the Dormition in the Moscow Kremlin.  The original cathedral, built by Metropolitan Petr in 1326, was in a dilapidated state; Philipp hired inexperienced workers and soon after his death the building collapsed. It was rebuilt by Aristotile Fioravanti under Metropolitan Gerontius.

Metropolitan Philip died on 5 April 1473 and was buried in the Cathedral of the Dorimition in the Moscow Kremlin.

References

Metropolitans of Kiev and all Rus' (Patriarchate of Moscow)
1473 deaths
Year of birth unknown
1402 births